Magdalena Grzybowska (born 22 November 1978) is a former Polish tennis player.

Grzybowska, born in Poznań, won the juniors singles competition at one Grand Slam tournament, the 1996 Australian Open.

She also competed for Poland in the 1996 Olympics in Atlanta, where she lost in the first round.

Since then, until her knee injury in 1998, she managed a rather successful career, culminating in the 30th position in the cumulative WTA rankings for that year, the highest ever standing for a Polish woman, until Agnieszka Radwańska.

Her attempts to resume competition were ultimately unsuccessful and she retired in 2002, at the age of 24.

Playing for Poland Fed Cup team, she has a win–loss record of 8–10.

After having retired from tennis, she completed her university studies in Paris, and is working as a tennis TV commentator for Eurosport in Warsaw, Poland.

ITF Circuit finals

Singles: 6 (4–2)

Doubles: 4 (3–1)

Head-to-head record
 Venus Williams 1–0
 Arantxa Sánchez Vicario 0–1
 Lindsay Davenport 0–1
 Monica Seles 0–1
 Dominique Monami 0–3

External links
 
 
 
 
 

1978 births
Living people
Polish female tennis players
Olympic tennis players of Poland
Tennis players at the 1996 Summer Olympics
Sportspeople from Poznań
Grand Slam (tennis) champions in girls' singles
Australian Open (tennis) junior champions
20th-century Polish women
21st-century Polish women